Abdulla Baiat (born 28 August 1983) is a Qatari footballer who is a defender for Al Kharitiyath.

External links
Player profile - footballdatabase.eu

1981 births
Living people
Qatari footballers
Al Sadd SC players
Al Kharaitiyat SC players
Qatar Stars League players
Association football defenders